Iveidae is a family of copepods belonging to the order Cyclopoida.

Genera:
 Ive Mayer, 1879
 Ubius Kesteven, 1913

References

Cyclopoida